Gabriel Lacroix (born 19 October 1993) is a former French rugby union player. His position was winger and he used to play for Stade Rochelais.

Club career
Born in Toulouse, he began his career with nearby club Toulouse in the Top 14 before moving to SC Albi and then Stade Rochelais. In December 2016, he scored four tries in twelve minutes against Bayonne. In 2021, after years of struggling with injuries, he announced his retirement from the sport.

International career
On 5 February 2017, Lacroix was called up to the France senior squad for the first time to replace the injured Yann David in the 2017 Six Nations.

References

1993 births
Living people
French rugby union players
Rugby union players from Toulouse
Stade Rochelais players
Rugby union wings
France international rugby union players
SC Albi players